Sheikh Zayed International Airport , also known as Rahim Yar Khan Airport, is located at Rahim Yar Khan, in the Punjab province of Pakistan. It is named after Zayed bin Sultan Al Nahyan, who provided funded the construction of the airport and road to his palace in Rahim Yar Khan.

Airlines and destinations

See also

 Airlines of Pakistan
 List of airports in Pakistan
 Pakistan Civil Aviation Authority
 Transport in Pakistan

References

External links
 
 

Airports in Punjab, Pakistan
International airports in Pakistan
Tourist attractions in Rahim Yar Khan
Pakistan–United Arab Emirates relations